Chiang Ying-li (born 8 October 1992) is a Taiwanese badminton player.

Achievement

Summer Universiade 
Women's singles

BWF International Challenge/Series 
Women's singles

Women's doubles

Mixed doubles

  BWF International Challenge tournament
  BWF International Series tournament
  BWF Future Series tournament

World University Championships 
Women's singles

References

External links 

 

Living people
1992 births
Taiwanese female badminton players
Badminton players at the 2010 Summer Youth Olympics
Universiade medalists in badminton
Badminton players at the 2018 Asian Games
Universiade gold medalists for Chinese Taipei
Universiade bronze medalists for Chinese Taipei
Asian Games competitors for Chinese Taipei
21st-century Taiwanese women